Hafizullah (Pashto/) is an Afghan male given name, meaning “remembrance of God“ - a transliteration of the elements Hafiz and Allah. The name may refers to:

Hafizullah Amin (1929–1979), General Secretary of the People's Democratic Party of Afghanistan 
Hafizullah Shabaz Khail (born 1946), Afghan held in Guantanamo
Hafizullah Emadi (born 1952), Afghan-American writer
Hafizullah (detainee) (born 1974), Afghan held in Guantanamo
Hafizullah Qadami (born 1985), Afghan footballer
Hafizullah Khaled, Afghan-Austrian peace activist and writer

Arabic masculine given names